In the English-speaking world, The Queen most commonly refers to:
 Elizabeth II (1926–2022), Queen of the United Kingdom and other Commonwealth realms from 1952 until her death

The Queen may also refer to:
 Camilla, Queen Consort (born 1947), Queen Consort of the United Kingdom and other Commonwealth realms since 2022
any past queen, or any present one from any non–English-speaking monarchy as a translation of her title, as well as to:

Arts, entertainment, and media
 The Queen: The Ladies Newspaper and Court Chronicle, launched in London in 1864
 The Queen (1968 film), a 1968 film documentary about Flawless Sabrina and the early NYC underground drag community
 The Queen (2006 film), a 2006 British drama film starring Helen Mirren about Queen Elizabeth II
 The Queen (2012 film), a 2012 Iranian film
 The Queen (play), a 1653 play published anonymously
 Evil Queen (Snow White),  the antagonist in Snow White and the Seven Dwarves
 The Queen (Dalida album), 2004 album by Dalida
 The Queen (Velvet album), 2009 album by Velvet
 The Queen Album, 1988 album by Elaine Paige
 "The Queen" (Velvet song), 2009
 The Queen (British TV serial), a 2009 Channel 4 drama-documentary about Queen Elizabeth II
 The Queen (Singaporean TV series), a 2016 Singaporean Channel 8 drama
 The Queen (South African TV series), a South African TV series, since 2016
 The Queen TV-Game 2, a Nintendo 3DS video game developed by Butterfly

Other
 The Queen, one of the GWR 3031 Class locomotives
 TSS The Queen, a South Eastern and Chatham Railway steamship
 Charlotte Flair, an American professional wrestler referred to as "The Queen"
 Yuna Kim, figure skater sometimes known as "The Queen"

See also
 Queen (disambiguation)
 Rani (disambiguation)